St. Xavier's School, Burdwan, is a private Catholic primary and secondary school located in Burdwan, West Bengal, India. The co-educational school was founded in 1964 and is managed by the Society of Jesus. It uses English as a medium for instruction and is unaided. This is the only co-educational Jesuit school under the St. Xavier's group of schools.

Program 
The early history of the school involved the demand for Jesuit education that exceeded the capacity of St. Francis Xavier School, Calcutta. After much prodding by the District Magistrate of Burdwan, the Jesuits opened a school here in 1964. 

The school uses the Continuous and Comprehensive Evaluation assessment of student progress. Various co-curricular and extra-curricular activities are encouraged for the students' integral development.  The school's motto is truth and justice, with emphasis on leadership in securing justice, especially for the most vulnerable. Team spirit and leadership qualities are fostered through the division of the school into four houses. Cultural programs and games are organized by the students. The school has a theatre hall for cultural offerings and for daily school assemblies.

In 2014 St. Xavier's School, Burdwan ranked 27th all over India for results on the internationally recognized Indian School Certificate (ISC) test. Recently the school added an ISC course in Biotechnology. In 2017,a graduate from the school ranked fourth in the state exam for entrance into medical schools.

See also

 List of Jesuit schools
 List of schools in West Bengal

References

External links
 Official site
 YouTube Tour
 YouTube Our school
 YouTube Students

Jesuit primary schools in India
Christian schools in West Bengal
Primary schools in West Bengal
High schools and secondary schools in West Bengal
Schools in Purba Bardhaman district
Educational institutions established in 1964
1964 establishments in West Bengal
Jesuit secondary schools in India